The 1915 Tipperary Senior Hurling Championship was the 26th staging of the Tipperary Senior Hurling Championship since its establishment by the Tipperary County Board in 1887.

Toomevara were the defending champions.

Boherlahan won the championship after a 4-04 to 1-02 defeat of Thurles in the final. It was their first ever championship title.

References

Tipperary
Tipperary Senior Hurling Championship